Wedding canopy  may refer to:
 Chuppah, the wedding canopy used in Jewish weddings
 Mandap, the wedding canopy used in Hindu, Sikh and Jain weddings
 Nuptial veil, the wedding canopy used in Christian weddings